7:14 is a set of numbers that may refer to several popular biblical passages:
Isaiah 7:14
Matthew 7:14

See also
3:16

Date and time disambiguation pages